Bahía Mansa is a settlement and bay located on the coast of Osorno Province, southern Chile. It is the main port between Corral Bay and Maullín River and the only port of Osorno Province. The town's economy revolves around tourism and fishing. Bahía Mansa is the namesake of the Bahía Mansa Metamorphic Complex.

References

Mansa
Geography of Los Lagos Region
Bodies of water of Los Lagos Region
Populated coastal places in Chile
Populated places in Osorno Province
Ports and harbours of Chile
Coasts of Los Lagos Region